2660 may refer to:

 2-6-6-0, a Whyte notation classification of steam locomotive
 2660 Wasserman, a minor planet
 2660 BC
 2660 AD/CE in the 27th century